Katainen is a Finnish surname. Notable people with the surname include:

 Elsi Katainen (born 1966), Finnish politician
 Jyrki Katainen (born 1971), Finnish politician

Finnish-language surnames